Macquarie Fields is an electoral district of the Legislative Assembly in the Australian state of New South Wales, located in the outer south-western suburbs of Sydney. It is currently represented by Anoulack Chanthivong of the Labor Party.

It currently includes the suburbs of Bardia, Bow Bowing, Casula, Cross Roads, Denham Court, Edmondson Park, Eschol Park, Glenfield, Ingleburn, Kearns, Kentlyn, Leppington, Leumeah, Long Point, Macquarie Fields, Macquarie Links, Minto, Minto Heights, Raby, St Andrews and Varroville.

Members for Macquarie Fields

Election results

References

Macquarie Fields
Macquarie Fields
1988 establishments in Australia
Macquarie Fields
1991 disestablishments in Australia
Macquarie Fields
1999 establishments in Australia